The estimated hydropower potential of the lower Mekong Basin (i.e., excluding China) is 30,000 MW, while that of the upper Mekong Basin is 28,930 MW. In the lower Mekong, more than 3,235 MW has been realized via facilities built largely over the past ten years, while projects under construction will represent an additional 3,209 MW. An additional 134 projects are planned for the lower Mekong, which will maximize the river's hydropower generating capacity. The single most significant impact—both now and in the future—on the use of water and its management in the Mekong Region is hydropower.

Given current development trends in the region, power demands are expected to rise seven percent per year between 2010 and 2030, yielding a substantial and potentially lucrative energy market. Hydropower is the favoured energy option for the Mekong's riparian countries.

The development of the Mekong River Basin is highly controversial, and is one of the most prominent components in the discussion about the river and its management. This debate occurs in both the academic literature, as well as the media, and is a focus for many activist groups.

Existing hydropower infrastructure
Table 1: Commissioned dams in the Mekong River Basin (15 MW installed capacity and above)

Hydropower infrastructure under construction

Table 2: Hydropower dams under construction in the Mekong River Basin (15 MW installed capacity and above)

Planned hydropower infrastructure

The CGIAR Research Program on Water, Land and Ecosystems, which monitors dams development in the Mekong Region, distinguishes between "planned" dams—those for which bureaucratic processes to license, or enable the dam to be constructed (for example, feasibility studies, concession agreements, environmental impact assessments, power purchase agreements and other government authorisations); and "proposed" dams that have been suggested, but for which these processes have not commenced.

Table 3: Planned and Proposed Hydropower dams in the Mekong River Basin (15 MW installed capacity and above)

Proposed mainstream dams

Table 4: Dams on the Mekong Mainstream

COD = Commercial Operating Date.

Environmental impacts
A study by the Mekong River Commission (MRC) presented at the Third MRC International Conference in March 2018, concluded that hydropower development on the Mekong River will aggravate food insecurity and poverty in the region. The report forecasts that Thailand is expected to suffer the most economically and ecologically. According to the report, full scale dam development will decrease GDP growth for lower Mekong basin countries by US$29 billion. Thailand would have the greatest economic loss, as much as US$11 billion. Laos and Cambodia would each face losses of US$9 billion in GDP growth. Native fish stocks would be particularly hard hit: more than 900,000 tonnes of fish biomass, worth US$4.3 billion, would disappear by 2040 from the Mekong as a result of dams. Thailand would have the highest rate of fish loss, 55 percent, followed by Laos, 50 percent; Cambodia, 35 percent; and Vietnam, 30 percent. The creation of reservoirs would result in many parts of the Mekong becoming a lake ecosystem, unsuitable for many native aquatic species of the river environment and will eventually drive them to extinction. A Lao government executive dismissed the research findings as "just an estimation". He insisted that hydropower dams were crucial to solving poverty and that they would provide large economic benefits to the entire region. Effective from 4 March 2021, a decree issued by the government of Laos requires all hydropower operators to inform authorities whenever dam reservoirs reach full capacity or when river levels fall to a critical level.  The new guidelines aim to improve the management of hydropower dams and minimize flooding and water shortages.

Social Impacts 
Social impacts such as livelihood and food insecurity largely effect riparian communities because of hydropower projects and these effects are multiplied by environmental issues of decreased water quality, decreased fish quantity and unstable water flow. Loss of livelihood has become more significant as more dams are constructed along the Mekong River and this has become more evident by the change in the river's biodiversity. For example, fisherman in a town in northeastern Thailand (Isan) estimate that their 2015 fish yield was only 30% of a normal year. The villagers of this same town also experience vulnerability in their cultural patterns as irregular flooding causes holidays and celebrations based on a water calendar to no longer coincide. Villages near dams experience other social issues alongside livelihood and food insecurity. A study of the Xe Pian Xe Namnoy Dam found that local communities face forced relocation, economic loss, livelihood insecurities, PTSD, food insecurity, and UXOs. Due to PTSD and psychological impacts incurred, many villagers also hesitate to return to their former villages and the stress about the present has resulted in increased anxiety over the future. As for food insecurity, the changing of the river flow due to hydropower projects has severely influenced agriculture and aquaculture as necessary nutrients for rice cultivation and fishery production are limited. Issues of food and livelihood security are also faced by those relocated. In Laos, the Nam Theun 2 Dam project moved 6300 people from 14 villages on the Nakai Plateau as part of the Resettlement Programme and another 155,000 people along the Xe Bangfai River were identified as affected but were given less financial support. The Nam Theun 2 Hydropower Company (NTPC) and the GoL implemented the resettlement programme but the Livelihood Resettlement Program’s 5 pillars designed for livelihood (forestry, fisheries, agriculture, livestock and off-farm activities), showed consistent failure in providing benefits and instead led to increased poverty levels. The Livelihood Resettlement Program is also at odds with the community's cultural practices which has caused additional vulnerability. The social impacts of hydropower projects permeate many different sectors of society and particularly those of riparian communities as they are not properly taken into account.

See also
 Mekong
 Mekong Delta
 Stung Sen River
 Se San River
 Tonle Sap
 Nam Ngum Dam
 International Rivers
 Mekong River Commission
 Yali Falls Dam
 Greater Mekong Sub-region Academic and Research Network
 GMS Environment Operations Center

References

External links

3S Rivers Protection Network
Australian Mekong Resource Centre
Cambodia National Mekong Committee
Department of Energy Business (DEB), Ministry of Energy and Mines (Lao PDR) 
Department of Water Resources (Thailand)
Electricité du Laos 
Electricity Authority of Cambodia
Electricity Generating Authority of Thailand 
Fisheries Action Coalition Team (Cambodia)
GMS Academic and Research Network
Greater Mekong Sub-region
Greater Mekong Subregion Environment Operations Center
Greater Mekong Sub-region Social Studies Center - 
International Rivers
Lao National Mekong Committee
Living River Siam
Mekong Basin Research Network
Mekong Environment and Resource Institute
MekongInfo
Mekong Institute
Mekong Program on Water, Environment and Resilience
Mekong River Commission
Mekong Wetlands Biodiversity Conservation and Sustainable Use Programme
Theun-Hinboun Power Company
Nam Theun 2
Probe International 
Save the Mekong Campaign
Stimson Institute Mekong Policy Project 
Sustainable Mekong Research Network (SUMERNET)
TERRA
Thailand National Mekong Committee
Vietnam Electricity
Vietnam National Mekong Committee
WWF Greater Mekong Programme

Mekong River
Hydropower
Greater Mekong Subregion